"It Must Be Love" is a song written by Bob McDill, and recorded by American country music artist Don Williams. It was released in July 1979 as the third single from the album Expressions.  The song was Williams' ninth Number One single on the  U.S. Billboard Hot Country Singles charts.

Charts

Weekly charts

Year-end charts

Alan Jackson version

In 2000, country music artist Alan Jackson recorded a cover of the song and released it as the third single from his album Under the Influence. Like Williams' version before it, Alan's cover also reached Number One on the Billboard country charts, a position that it held for one week. It also managed to reach the Top 40 on the Billboard Hot 100, peaking at #37.

Chart performance
"It Must Be Love" debuted at number 68 on the U.S. Billboard Hot Country Singles & Tracks for the week of April 29, 2000.

Year-end charts

References

1979 singles
2000 singles
Don Williams songs
Alan Jackson songs
Songs written by Bob McDill
Song recordings produced by Garth Fundis
Song recordings produced by Keith Stegall
MCA Records singles
Arista Nashville singles
1979 songs